Sir Roy Alexander Stone  (born 1961) is a former British civil servant. From 2000 until 2021, he was Principal Private Secretary to the Government Chief Whip.

Career 
Born in 1961, Stone joined HM Civil Service in 1977 to work in project management in the Ministry of Defence (MoD). In 1983, he moved to the MoD Procurement Executive. In 1988, he joined the staff at 10 Downing Street as a duty clerk, then working as a parliamentary clerk from 1989 to 1998.

In 1998, he joined the office of the Government Chief Whip and worked as deputy to the Principal Private Secretary, Murdo Maclean. Stone succeeded Maclean on the latter's retirement in 2000 and has held the office since. Part of his role was to ensure that there was enough parliamentary time to pass the government's legislation; this entailed liaising with government ministers and opposition officials.

Honours 
He was appointed a Commander of the Order of the British Empire "for parliamentary and public service" in the 2014 New Year Honours, and a Knight Bachelor in the 2019 New Year Honours. In justifying his knighthood, the Cabinet Office stated that Stone "is an outstanding senior civil servant... responsible for the effective operation of the House of Commons Business Management team ... he has given unstinting service to twelve Chief Whips, and has played a vital role in delivering the Government's legislative priorities over this period".

References 

1961 births
British civil servants
Knights Bachelor
Commanders of the Order of the British Empire
Living people